The Poolbar Festival is an annual music and culture festival in the city of Feldkirch in the Austrian province of Vorarlberg. Between 20,000 and 25,000 visitors attend the festival each year.

The festival 
It was first held in 1994 as a cultural summer-academy and is through organization and implementation of landscape and architecture very different to other open-air events.

Placed at the geographical interface between Austria, Germany, Liechtenstein and Switzerland, the "Altes Hallenbad" in Feldkirch becomes a cross-border hotspot every summer, when the poolbar festival opens its doors to all its visitors, cultural disputes and events for several weeks during July and August. In addition to concerts and parties, the festival offers for six weeks a broad variety of cinema and short films, cabaret, poetry slam, pop quiz, fashion performances and discussions. 

The festival takes place in the city center in the former indoor pool (Altes Hallenbad) of the private school Stella Matutina in the Reichenfeld park. The furniture, which is renewed every summer, is determined by an international architecture competition. The competition is organized by the Vorarlberger Architekturinstitut (VAI; Institute of Vorarlberg Architecture) as well as the local Chamber of Commerce. Art and fashion competitions are also held at the festival.

Despite the COVID-19-pandemic, 10,000 visitors were able to attend the festival in 2020.

Since 2020, the Poolbar Festival has been awarding the Vorarlberg Music Prize "Sound@V" together with ORF Vorarlberg and Wann&Wo. This is endowed with 20,000 euros in prize money.

Awards 

 2013: Culture award of the City of Feldkirch ("Kulturpreis der Stadt Feldkirch")
 2014: Austrian culture award for cultural initiatives ("Österreichischer Kunstpreis für Kulturinitiativen")

Line-ups 
Line-ups of past festival years (not complete):

2022: Sportfreunde Stiller, Metronomy, Local Natives, Kytes, HVOB, 5/8erl in Ehr'n, Alicia Edelweiss, My Ugly Clementine, Wolf Haas, Alfred Dorfer
2021: The Notwist, Cari Cari, Sharktank, Mighty Oaks, Patrice
2020: Lou Asril, Nneka, Buntspecht
2019: Bilderbuch, Xavier Rudd, Mattiel, The Twilight Sad, Tove Lo, Propaghandi
2018: Eels, Ziggy Marley, Shout Out Louds, The Subways, Seasick Steve
 2017: Pixies, Jake Bugg, Sohn, The Naked And Famous, HVOB, Leyya, Conor Oberst
 2016: Nada Surf, Travis, Dispatch, Peaches, Lola Marsh, Bilderbuch
 2015: Patrice, Wanda, William Fitzsimmons, Elektro Guzzi, Dillon, Darwin Deez, Colour Haze
 2014: Shout Out Louds, Bonaparte, The Dandy Warhols, Anna Calvi, Maximo Park
 2013: My Bloody Valentine, Frank Turner, Young Rebel Set, Casper, Bad Religion, Kate Nash
 2012: Marilyn Manson, Regina Spektor, Yann Tiersen, Theophilus London, The Whitest Boy Alive, Gogol Bordello
 2011: Portugal The Man, The Subways, Molotov, Kettcar, dEUS, Hercules & Love Affair
 2010: Nada Surf, Juliette Lewis, Flogging Molly, Ebony Bones, Die Goldenen Zitronen
 2009: Dropkick Murphys, Anti-Flag, Morcheeba, Art Brut
 2008: The Wombats, The Notwist, Friska Viljor, Modeselektor, Iron and Wine
 2007: Shout Out Louds, Kosheen, Final Fantasy, Slut, IAMX
 2006: Calexico, Vendetta, Trail of Dead, Attwenger, Eagle*Seagull

References

External links 
 Official Website of the Festival (in German)

Festivals in Vorarlberg
Feldkirch, Vorarlberg
Music festivals in Austria